is a Japanese voice actress from Chiba Prefecture affiliated with Production Ace.

Filmography

Television animation
Aquarian Age: Sign for Evolution (Receptionist, nurse)
Bakugan Battle Brawlers (Wavern)
Bakugan Battle Brawlers: New Vestroia (Wavern)
Banner of the Stars (Kotoponī, crew)
Carried by the Wind: Tsukikage Ran (Kuma)
Detective Conan (Beauty artist, housekeeper, woman, companion, others)
Crest of the Stars (Crew)
Devil Lady (Emiko Sakazawa, stylist, model, underclassmen, others)
Dual! Parallel Trouble Adventure (Kaori Hayase)
Ghost Stories (Child)
Go! Go! Itsutsugo Land (Boy, henchman)
I My Me! Strawberry Eggs (Miho Umeda's mother, music teacher)
Kokoro Library (Kājīenjeru)
Magical Girl Lyrical Nanoha StrikerS (Carim Gracia)
Magical Girl Lyrical Nanoha Vivid (Carim Gracia)
Maico 2010 (Izumi)
Mon Colle Knights (Ma Kami Tōbatsu Tai)
Please Teacher! (Todoroki's wife)
Sasami: Mahou Shōjo Club (Mayoko-sensei)
Secret of Cerulean Sand (Hanan Village woman)
Tenchi Muyo! GXP (Gyokuren)
Turn A Gundam (Belleen Bondo)

Video games
Bloody Roar 4 (Nagi)
Onimusha series (Kaede)
Suikoden IV (Katarina Cott)
Suikoden Tactics (Katarina Cott)
The Oneechanbara series (Saki)
Sonic the Hedgehog series (Blaze the Cat)
Wild Arms 4 (Enil Aidem)
Xenoblade Chronicles X (Irina)

Drama CDs
Princess Princess (Yuujirou Shihoudani)

Dubbing roles

Live-action
Cory in the House (Samantha Samuels)
Duets (Liv Dean (Gwyneth Paltrow))
Flight (Nicole (Kelly Reilly))
Lost (Kate Austen)
The Rock (1999 NTV edition) (Jade Angelou (Claire Forlani))
School of Rock (Patty Di Marco (Sarah Silverman))
The Twilight Zone (Donna Saicheck (Bonnie Somerville)) (Episode:How Much Do You Love Your Kid?)
Unbreakable (Child)
The Virgin Suicides (Mary Lisbon (A. J. Cook))

Animation
Thomas and Friends (Mirabel, Dulce and Victoria)
Little Bear (Mendori)

References

External links
 
 

1973 births
Living people
Japanese video game actresses
Japanese voice actresses
Voice actresses from Chiba Prefecture